Malmö Devilants RFC is a Swedish gay rugby union and volleyball club in Malmö. Malmö Devilants was founded 2004 and was the first gay rugby team in Scandinavia. Malmö Devilants is a member of International Gay Rugby Association and Board. Devilants have been playing in Union Cup in 2005 and 2007. In 2007 the club also started a volleyball team.

Malmö Devilants in Union Cup

2007 

Malmö Devilants came fourth in Union Cup 2007. Beating NOP Amsterdam 20–10 before losing to Cardiff Lions (5–35), Emerald Warriors (5–60) and Caledonian Thebans (15–20).

See also

LGBT community

References

Sources
Union cup 2007 
IGRAB 
Malmö Devilants

External links
Malmö Devilants
Article about Devilants in QX (Scandinavians biggest gay magazine) 
Article about Devilants in QX (Scandinavians biggest gay magazine) 

International Gay Rugby member clubs
Swedish rugby union teams